The International Racquetball Federation's 17th Racquetball World Championships were held in Burlington, Ontario, Canada from June 14 to 21, 2014. This was the second time Worlds were in Canada. Previously, they were in Montreal in 1992.

American Rocky Carson and Mexican Paola Longoria were the incumbent champions in men's and women's singles, respectively, and both successfully defended their titles.
 
Longoria was also the incumbent champion in women's doubles with Samantha Salas and they also successfully defended their title. Fellow Mexicans Alvaro Beltran and Javier Moreno were the defending champions in men's doubles, but Mexico didn't make the podium in Burlington. 

Instead, Colombians Sebastian Franco and Alejandro Herrera defeated Canadians Mike Green and Vincent Gagnon in the final, which was the first men's doubles World Championship not won by either the USA or Mexico.

Tournament format
The 2014 World Championships was the first competition with an initial round robin stage that was used to seed players for an elimination qualification round. Previously, players were seeded into an elimination round based on how their countries had done at previous World Championships, and then a second team competition was also played. This year there was no team competition. Team standings were based on points earned from the singles and doubles competitions.

Events

Men's singles

Women's singles

Men's doubles

Women's doubles

Medal table

Team results

References

External links
IRF website

 
World Championships
2014 in Canadian sports
2014 in Ontario
2014
International sports competitions hosted by Canada
Burlington, Ontario
2014
June 2014 sports events in Canada